Pataplume may refer to:
Leger Pataplume 1, a French tendem seat homebuilt aircraft design
Leger Pataplume 2, a French side-by-side homebuilt aircraft design